The 2019 German Darts Grand Prix was the third of thirteen PDC European Tour events on the 2019 PDC Pro Tour. The tournament took place at Kulturhalle Zenith, Munich, Germany, from 20–22 April 2019. It featured a field of 48 players and £140,000 in prize money, with £25,000 going to the winner.

Michael van Gerwen was the defending champion after defeating Peter Wright 8–5 in the final of the 2018 tournament, and he defended his title by beating Simon Whitlock 8–3 in the final, which was his 30th European Tour title since its inception in 2012.

Prize money
This is how the prize money is divided:

 Seeded players who lose in the second round do not receive this prize money on any Orders of Merit.

Qualification and format
The top 16 entrants from the PDC ProTour Order of Merit on 5 March will automatically qualify for the event and will be seeded in the second round.

The remaining 32 places will go to players from six qualifying events – 18 from the UK Tour Card Holder Qualifier (held on 15 March), six from the European Tour Card Holder Qualifier (held on 15 March), two from the West & South European Associate Member Qualifier (held on 19 April), four from the Host Nation Qualifier (held on 19 April), one from the Nordic & Baltic Qualifier (held on 6 October 2018) and one from the East European Associate Member Qualifier (held on 20 January).

From 2019, the Host Nation, Nordic & Baltic and East European Qualifiers will only be available to non-tour card holders. Any tour card holders from the applicable regions will have to play the main European Qualifier. The only exceptions being that the Nordic & Baltic qualifiers for the first 3 European Tour events took place in late 2018, before the new ruling was announced.

Gerwyn Price, who was set to be the 3rd seed, withdrew prior to the tournament draw. All seeds below him moved up a place, with Danny Noppert becoming sixteenth seed, and an extra place being made available in the Host Nation Qualifier.

The following players will take part in the tournament:

Top 16
  Michael van Gerwen (champion)
  Ian White (second round)
  Peter Wright (second round)
  Mensur Suljović (quarter-finals)
  Rob Cross (semi-finals)
  Adrian Lewis (second round)
  James Wade (second round)
  Michael Smith (second round)
  Jonny Clayton (second round)
  Max Hopp (semi-finals)
  Joe Cullen (quarter-finals)
  Daryl Gurney (third round)
  Dave Chisnall (third round)
  Simon Whitlock (runner-up)
  Darren Webster (third round)
  Danny Noppert (second round)

UK Qualifier
  Keegan Brown (second round)
  Ricky Evans (third round)
  Alan Norris (first round)
  Glen Durrant (second round)
  Stephen Bunting (third round)
  Steve Beaton (first round)
  Nathan Derry (second round)
  Chris Dobey (first round)
  Ritchie Edhouse (third round)
  Kyle Anderson (second round)
  Josh Payne (second round)
  Ted Evetts (quarter-finals)
  Mark Barilli (first round)
  Ross Smith (third round)
  Arron Monk (second round)
  Mark Wilson (first round)
  Brendan Dolan (first round)
  Jamie Hughes (first round)

European Qualifier
  Kim Huybrechts (third round)
  Krzysztof Ratajski (second round)
  Gabriel Clemens (first round)
  Cristo Reyes (second round)
  Martin Schindler (first round)

West/South European Qualifier
  Michael Rasztovits (second round)
  Diogo Portela (first round)

Host Nation Qualifier
  Michael Hurtz (first round)
  Kevin Münch (first round)
  Marko Puls (first round)
  Dragutin Horvat (first round)
  Jyhan Artut (first round)

Nordic & Baltic Qualifier
  Magnus Caris (first round)

East European Qualifier
  Karel Sedláček (quarter-finals)

Draw

References 

2019 PDC Pro Tour
2019 PDC European Tour
2019 in German sport
April 2019 sports events in Germany